Piece of Cake is a 1988 British six-part television serial depicting the life of a Royal Air Force fighter squadron from the day of the British entry into World War II through to one of the toughest days in the Battle of Britain (7 September 1940). The series was produced by Holmes Associates for LWT for ITV and had a budget of five million pounds.

Synopsis
The series is based on the 1983 novel Piece of Cake, by Derek Robinson. In the book, the squadron is equipped with Hurricanes. The relative rarity of airworthy Hurricanes in the late 1980s precluded their use in the television series.

The squadron depicted is the fictional Hornet Squadron, which is equipped with Supermarine Spitfire fighters, and deployed to France, where it waits out the Phoney War in comfort and elegance, until the German attack on Western Europe in May 1940.  One by one, nearly all of the original pilots are killed and as losses mount, the character of the squadron changes from a casual nonchalance to a fight for survival.  By the end of the series, only four of the original fourteen officers have survived.

Some of the major themes explored in the script include: the snobbery and class-consciousness that existed in the RAF during the era; the belief cherished by many of the pilots that the war would be fought as a sporting gentleman's contest; the inflexibility and ineffectiveness of the tactics used by RAF Fighter Command in early 1940 and the poor gunnery skills and inadequate training of many of the British pilots in the early days of World War II. Like Robinson's original novel, the story spans the first year of the war, from September 1939 to the German Luftwaffe's first massed aerial assault on London on 7 September 1940.

Main cast
 Squadron Leader Ramsey (Pilot. Commanding Officer. Killed 1939) – Jack McKenzie
 Squadron Leader Rex (Pilot. Ramsey's successor. Killed 1940) – Tim Woodward
 Flight Lieutenant Marriott (Engineering Officer. Killed 1940) – Stephen MacKenna
 Flight Lieutenant 'Uncle' Kellaway (Adjutant) – David Horovitch
 Flight Lieutenant 'Fanny' Barton (Pilot and Flight Commander. Succeeded Rex as Commanding Officer May 1940) – Tom Burlinson
 Flying Officer 'Skull' Skelton (Intelligence Officer) – Richard Hope
 Flying Officer 'Moggy' Cattermole (Pilot. Killed 1940) – Neil Dudgeon
 Flying Officer 'Pip' Patterson (Pilot) – George Anton
 Flying Officer 'Flip' Moran (Pilot and Flight Commander. Killed 1940) – Gerard O'Hare
 Flying Officer 'Flash' Gordon (Pilot. Killed 1940) – Nathaniel Parker
 Pilot Officer 'Fitz' Fitzgerald (Pilot. Killed 1940) – Jeremy Northam
 Pilot Officer 'Zab' Zabarnowski (Pilot. Killed 1940) – Tomek Bork
 Pilot Officer 'Sticky' Stickwell (Pilot. Killed 1940) – Gordon Lovitt
 Pilot Officer 'Mother' Cox (Pilot. Wounded in Action 1940) – Patrick Bailey
 Pilot Officer Hart (Replacement Pilot. U.S. Volunteer. Killed 1940) – Boyd Gaines
 Pilot Officer 'Dickie' Starr (Pilot. Killed 1939) – Tom Radcliffe
 Pilot Officer 'Moke' Miller (Pilot. Killed 1940) – Mark Womack
 Mary (Schoolteacher and wife to Fitz. Widowed 1940) - Helena Michell
 Pilot Officer Trevelyan (Pilot. Killed 1940) - Jason Calder
 Pilot Officer 'Dumbo' Dutton (Pilot. Killed 1940) - Sam Miller
 Pilot Officer 'Boy' Lloyd (Pilot. Killed 1940) - Timothy Lyn
 LAC Todd (Ground-Crew) - Neil Clark
 LAC Gullet (Batman) - John Bleasdale
 Medical Officer - Richard Durden
 Henri (Cafe Owner) - Daniel Andre Pageon
 Air Commodore Bletchley - Michael Elwyn

Crew
Director – Ian Toynton
Producer – Andrew Holmes
Associate producers – Adrian Bate and Robert Eagle
Executive producer – Linda Agran

Episodes

Releases

The series (in its complete original format of six episodes) was released on Region-1 DVD through BFS Entertainment in a 3-disc set in 2000 and has been re-issued in a new edition (also via BFS and in Region 1) in March 2011.

When the series was screened on Network Seven in Australia in 1990, the original run-time of over five hours was shortened to less than four so that it could be shown in two two-hour episodes (plus commercials). In order to condense the series, a considerable amount of footage was cut, mostly from scenes on the ground including some entire scenes such as when Chris Hart invites one of the ground-crew LAC Todd to play squash and the press conference held on Hornet Squadron's airfield in France.

Production
Six mock-up Spitfires were built as static or ground-running props. Most were destroyed during the air-raid sequences later in filming.

Original plans called for six Spitfires to be used in the UK filming of the series (a Mk.1a, a Mk.VIIIc, three Mk.IXs and a PR.Mk.XI), but the owner of the Mk.VIIIc could not participate after a family member was severely injured in an unrelated air accident and filming commenced with five Spitfires painted in a generic period-correct scheme. A sixth Spitfire was flown in the US for the bomber shoot-down scenes with a Heinkel 111.

Veteran display pilot Ray Hanna (1928-2005) performed the scene where a Spitfire flies under a bridge in France. The scene itself was filmed by the stone bridge at Winston near Barnard Castle and Hanna, a New Zealand-born former RAF fighter pilot and Red Arrows leader, flew his own Spitfire LF.Mk.IX "MH434/G-ASJV" for the sequence. Hanna's son Mark also flew in the production.

The series used footage from the 1969 motion picture Battle of Britain for many of the dogfight scenes. Air-to-air filming of the aerial sequences was done with a vintage B-25 Mitchell bomber, Harvard trainer and an Agusta 109 helicopter, all of which served as camera ships for the shoot.

The production made use of three vintage Messerschmitt Bf 109s which were actually Hispano Ha 1112 Buchons, a Merlin-powered version of the Bf 109 that was used by the Spanish Air-Force up until the late 1960s. These same aircraft later also appeared in the motion-picture Memphis Belle in 1990. To portray Luftwaffe bombers in the series, two Heinkel He 111 (also Spanish-built versions) were used. An airworthy example was filmed in an aerial battle with a Spitfire (both operated by the Confederate Air Force) in Texas, USA and in the UK a partially dismantled aircraft was used for the filming of the scene where Hornet Squadron visits the crash site of their very first 'kill' in France. The 'crashed' Heinkel, registered G-AWHB, was flown to the UK from Spain in 1968 to be used in the filming of the movie Battle of Britain and later appeared in the film Patton.

For the scene where Cattermole and Steele-Stebbing destroy a German rescue aircraft, a vintage Junkers Ju 52 (Spanish-built CASA-353L) was used.

Scenes at the 'Chateau St. Pierre' were filmed at Charlton Park, Wiltshire, where the Earl of Suffolk has a private airstrip. The airfield used to represent 'RAF Bodkin Hazel' was the long-disused RAF Friston sited on the East Sussex coast alongside the imposing Seven Sisters cliffs. Some of the exterior filming for the first episode of the series (at Hornet Squadron's original base, "RAF Kingsmere") was completed at South Cerney airfield in Gloucestershire UK which, in 1988, still featured several period hangars and a pre-war control tower.

For the French airfield scenes at "Le Touquet", the producers filmed at Cambridge Airport.

In an interview in 2010, Derek Robinson, author of the original novel Piece of Cake remarked that when the novel was first published in 1983, the first edition sold poorly in the UK, although it did well in the US. He credits the 1988 LWT production with greatly reviving interest in the novel.

References

External links

1988 British television series debuts
1988 British television series endings
1980s British television miniseries
ITV television dramas
Television shows shot at EMI-Elstree Studios
Royal Air Force mass media
Battle of Britain films
World War II television drama series
British military television series
Aviation television series
Television series by ITV Studios
London Weekend Television shows
English-language television shows
1980s British drama television series